Grimaze (stylized in all caps) is a Bulgarian metal band from Sofia. The band consists of vocalists Georgi Ivanov and Pavel Krumov, guitarist Melina Krumova and bassist Philip Kolarov.

History 
The band was formed in 2013. In 2016, Grimaze released their first two singles, "Survival of the Fittest"  and "My Vow". Later on in the year, the band released their first EP, Dreammares.

In 2018, the band released their album Planet Grimaze, along with a video for the song "Endless Life Force".

In the autumn of 2018, Grimaze was a part of the Anticult Balkan Tour 2018 with Decapitated, Hatesphere, Thy Disease and Dehydrated.

Genre and lyrical themes 
Grimaze's sound is not easily classified as it is a mixture of several different styles. Genres that have been associated with the band are technical death metal, groove metal and progressive metal.

The band's lyrics reflect on a deeper self-knowledge, improvement and purification.

Band members 
Members
 Georgi Ivanov – vocals (2017–present)
Pavel Krumov – vocals (2013–present)
 Melina Krumova – guitar (2013–present)
 Philip Kolarov – bass (2018–present)

Past Members
 Kris Sadovsky – bass (2013–2015)
 Anton Dimitrov – bass (2015–2018)
 Nedislav Miladinov – drums (2013–2020)

Discography 
Dreammares (2016)
Planet Grimaze (2018)

Tours 
 Anticult Balkan Tour 2018 – Ostrava, Brno, Budapest, Graz, Rijeka, Novi Sad, Sofia, Istanbul, Bucharest, Cluj-Napoca, Timișoara, Kosice, Bratislava
Spring Break Tour  – Sofia, Plovdiv, Burgas, Varna (2016)
 European Tour  – Skopje, Krusevac, Niš, Sarajevo, Budapest, Vienna, Munich, Subotica, Bucharest, Sofia  (2016)
 Tour "Clean Home" – Dobrich, Burgas, Varna, Sevlievo, Ruse, Plovdiv, Stara Zagora, Pleven, Sofia (2016) – They made a video from the tour: https://www.youtube.com/watch?v=eAO5t4m9Ck0

References

External links 
 Official website
YouTube channel of the band
Photos of the band
 Grimaze at Bulgarian Rock Archives
The Metal Archives

Bulgarian death metal musical groups
Groove metal musical groups
Musical groups established in 2013
Bulgarian heavy metal musical groups
2013 establishments in Bulgaria